Thiruvenkatachari Parthasarathy (born 1 March 1941, in Chennai, Tamil Nadu) is a game theorist and distinguished Indian mathematician and the co-author of a book on game theory with T. E. S. Raghavan, and of two research monographs, one on optimization and one on univalence theory, published by Springer-Verlag. He is a former president of the Indian Mathematical Society.

He received his B.Sc and M.Sc degrees from Madras University. He worked on "Minimax Theorems and Product solutions for simple games" under the guidance of the eminent C. R. Rao and received Ph.D during 1967 from the Indian Statistical Institute, Kolkata. He actively delivers many lectures and seminars at University of Madras, ISI and CMI.

Parthasarathy received Shanti Swaroop Bhatnagar Award for Mathematical Sciences (1986). He was elected as Fellow of the Indian Academy of Sciences (1988) and Indian National Science Academy (1995).

External links
 https://web.archive.org/web/20110716084817/https://www.bschool.nus.edu.sg/Departments/Decision%20Sciences/files/Bio%20of%20speakers/Thiruvenkatachari-B.htm

Living people
20th-century Indian mathematicians
1941 births
Presidents of the Indian Mathematical Society
Fellows of the Indian Academy of Sciences
Scientists from Chennai
Recipients of the Shanti Swarup Bhatnagar Award in Mathematical Science